"Help Me" is a song by recording artist Tinchy Stryder, and was released on 30 September 2012, as the fourth single from his cancelled fourth studio album Full Tank. Full Tank was scrapped so Help Me became a non-album single. The song, produced by Art Bastian, was written by Tinchy Stryder, Camille Purcell and Ollie Jacobs, and features uncredited vocals by Camille Purcell.

Background
The single was announced during an interview with Digital Spy, uploaded on 12 July 2012, and Tinchy Stryder announcing he is now reinvented, and that with "Help Me" – It reaches out religiously to God. "Help Me" is incorporated with female verses and vocals.

The track was co-written by Kwasi Danquah III, Camille Purcell and Ollie Jacobs, and was produced by Art Bastian.

Music video
A music video was made for "Help Me", and it was filmed in New Orleans, Louisiana. The accompanying music video sees Tinchy Stryder performing the track in a poverty-stricken neighbourhood.

Other scenes focus on Christian iconography, statues and buildings, directly representing the chorus's lyrics of "God, help me".

Track listing
Digital Single

Credits and personnel
Songwriter – Kwasi Danquah III, Ollie Jacobs, Camille Purcell
Production – Art Bastian
Mixing – Jeremy Wheatley
Label – Takeover Entertainment Limited

Release history

References

External links
 

2012 singles
2012 songs
Tinchy Stryder songs
Takeover Entertainment singles
Songs with music by Tinchy Stryder
Songs written by Kamille (musician)
Songs written by Ollie Jacobs